Ratboy is a 1986 American drama film directed by and starring Sondra Locke. The make-up effects were designed by Rick Baker. The film's scenario is at times comic or serious, and one of its peculiarities is that there never is any explanation for Ratboy's origin and existence as a human-rat hybrid.

Ratboy had a troubled production and was both a critical and commercial failure. However, it received better reviews in European countries, especially France, winning the Deauville American Film Festival.

Synopsis 
A former window dresser named Nikki overhears mention of a mysterious "Ratboy" named Eugene while dumpster diving at a dump. After finding and befriending him, Nikki makes several attempts at marketing his uniqueness to the public. At the same time, Eugene wishes to avoid public attention.

In the end, the police are searching for Eugene's body, as Nikki stands by, saddened, until a crystal in her jacket pocket begins to glow. Eugene has survived the police gunfire and is hiding atop a tree, signaling to Nikki. Nikki is happy that Eugene is alive. Eugene then flees as the police continue searching for him.

Cast 
 Sondra Locke as Nikki Morrison
 Sharon Baird as Eugene / Ratboy (as S.L. Baird)
 Robert Townsend as Manny
 Christopher Hewett as Acting Coach
 Larry Hankin as Robert Jewell
 Sydney Lassick as Lee 'Dial-A-Prayer'
 Gerrit Graham as Billy Morrison
 Louie Anderson as Omer Morrison
 Billie Bird as Psychic
 John Witherspoon as Heavy
 Charles Bartlett as Catullus Cop
 Gordon Anderson as the voice of Ratboy
 Tim Thomerson as Alan Reynolds (uncredited)

Reception 
The film has a 'rotten' rating of 25% on Rotten Tomatoes. Roger Ebert of the Chicago Sun-Times gave it two out of four stars, calling the film 'perplexing' and criticizing the film's unique premise devolving into a more standard narrative.  Janet Maslin of The New York Times called the film 'disorganized', criticizing the script and directing choices of Locke. On the opposite end, Michael Wilmington of The Los Angeles Times was more positive, calling the film, 'Grimm Brothers-style, mixing wonder with rough edges, undertones of pain beneath the fantasy.'

Awards
Sondra Locke received a 1987 Razzie nomination for Worst Actress, losing to Madonna for Who's That Girl.

References

External links 
 
 

1986 films
Warner Bros. films
Films directed by Sondra Locke
1986 drama films
American drama films
Malpaso Productions films
Films scored by Lennie Niehaus
1986 directorial debut films
1980s English-language films
1980s American films